The Double-A All-Star Game was an annual baseball game held from 1991 to 2002 between professional players from the affiliated Double-A leagues of Minor League Baseball—the Eastern League (EL), Southern League (SL), and Texas League (TL). Teams of American League-affiliated Double-A All-Stars faced off against teams of National League-affiliated Double-A All-Stars. Seven games were won by American League teams, and five were won by National League teams.

History 
The three Double-A leagues of Minor League Baseball—the Eastern League (EL), Southern League (SL), and Texas League (TL)—were inspired by the success of the Triple-A All-Star Game, which was first held in 1988, to combine for their own meeting of their classification's All-Stars. The first Double-A All-Star game was played in 1991 at Joe W. Davis Stadium in Huntsville, Alabama. Players were divided into teams of American League affiliates and National League affiliates as voted on by members of the local media in each of the classification's 26 cities. In later years, teams were selected by the three league presidents.

Despite the game's initial commercial success, the travel logistics involving teams stretching from El Paso, Texas, to Altoona, Pennsylvania, made organizing the game difficult. The creation of the All-Star Futures Game in 1999 drew away both publicity and players. The final Double-A All-Star Game was played in 2002 at Senator Thomas J. Dodd Memorial Stadium in Norwich, Connecticut.

Results

Most Valuable Player Award 

Through 1996, a Most Valuable Player (MVP) Award was given to the player with the best performance from each Double-A league. One award was planned for the overall Most Valuable Player in 1997, but two players were selected as co-MVPs. Single MVPs were also selected in 1998 and 2000. In the final two years of contention, 2001 and 2002, the classification reverted to the original format and selected three MVPs, one from each league.

Three players from the El Paso Diablos and Huntsville Stars were each selected for MVP Awards, more than any other teams. The Harrisburg Senators, Knoxville/Tennessee Smokies, Memphis Chicks, Midland Angels/RockHounds, New Britain Red Sox/Rock Cats, and Orlando SunRays/Cubs each had two MVPs.

See also 

 Southern League All-Star Game

Notes

References 

Eastern League (1938–present)
Southern League (1964–present)
Texas League
All-star games
Baseball competitions in the United States
Recurring sporting events established in 1991
Recurring sporting events established in 2002
Minor league baseball competitions